Filip Cvijović (born 3 July 2000) is a Serbian footballer currently playing as a goalkeeper for Serbian First League side Sloboda Užice.

Career statistics

Club

Notes

References

2000 births
Living people
Serbian footballers
Association football goalkeepers
Serbian First League players
FK Sloboda Užice players